Çuxur Qəbələ (also, Chukhurkabala and Chukhur-Kebele) is a village and municipality in the Qabala Rayon of Azerbaijan.  It has a population of 913.

References 

Populated places in Qabala District